Jedvaj is a Croatian surname. Notable people with the surname include:

Tin Jedvaj (born 1995), Croatian footballer, son of Zdenko
Zdenko Jedvaj (born 1966), retired Croatian footballer, father of Tin

Croatian surnames
Slavic-language surnames
Patronymic surnames